The Oliver E. Buckley Condensed Matter Prize is an annual award given by the American Physical Society "to recognize and encourage outstanding theoretical or experimental contributions to condensed matter physics."  It was endowed by AT&T Bell Laboratories as a means of recognizing outstanding scientific work.  The prize is named in honor of Oliver Ellsworth Buckley, a former president of Bell Labs.

The prize is normally awarded to one person but may be shared if multiple recipients contributed to the same accomplishments.  Nominations are active for three years.  The prize was endowed in 1952 and first awarded in 1953.

Recipients

See also
 List of physics awards

References

External links
APS page on the Buckley Prize

Condensed matter physics awards
Awards of the American Physical Society